Charles L. Krehmeyer  (July 5, 1863 – February 10, 1926) was a 19th-century professional baseball player. He was a member of a small fraternity--left-handed catchers. Although official sources give an 1863 birthdate, research by his SABR biographer gives substantial support to an 1859 birthdate.

External links

1863 births
1926 deaths
Major League Baseball catchers
Major League Baseball outfielders
Louisville Colonels players
St. Louis Browns (AA) players
St. Louis Maroons players
19th-century baseball players
Columbus Stars (baseball) players
Bridgeport Giants players
Memphis Grays players
Nashville Americans players
Omaha Omahogs players
Kalamazoo Kazoos players
Sacramento Altas players
Peoria Canaries players
Houston Mud Cats players
Fort Worth Panthers players
Waco Tigers players
Dallas Hams players
Lawrence Jayhawks players
Birmingham Grays players
Birmingham Blues players
Birmingham Pensacola players
Quincy Ravens players
Houston Magnolias players
Baseball players from Missouri

 Charlie Krehmeyerr at SABR (Baseball BioProject)